The 1794 United States elections occurred in the middle of President George Washington's second term. Members of the 4th United States Congress were chosen in this election. Tennessee was admitted as a state during the 4th Congress. The election took place at the beginning of the First Party System, with the Democratic-Republican Party and Federalist Party emerging as political parties, succeeding the anti-administration faction and the pro-administration faction.

In the House, the Democratic-Republicans picked up a small number of seats, increasing their majority. However, Federalist Jonathan Dayton was elected Speaker of the House, defeating Frederick Muhlenberg, who had a less clear partisan affiliation.

In the Senate, the Federalists picked up a moderate number of seats, increasing their majority.

Washington remained unaffiliated with any political faction or party throughout his presidency.

See also
1794–95 United States House of Representatives elections
1794–95 United States Senate elections

References

1794 elections in the United States
1794
United States midterm elections